Nothing's Shocking is the debut studio album by American alternative rock band Jane's Addiction, released on August 23, 1988 through Warner Bros. Records. Nothing's Shocking was well received by critics and peaked at number 103 on the Billboard 200. The single "Jane Says" reached number six on the Billboard Modern Rock Tracks in 1988. Rolling Stone ranked Nothing's Shocking at number 312 on its "500 Greatest Albums of All Time".

Recording
Warner Bros. Records gave Jane's Addiction a list of producers to choose from. The band's frontman, Perry Farrell, appreciated Dave Jerden's work as engineer on David Byrne and Brian Eno's album, My Life in the Bush of Ghosts. Jerden said he "jumped" at the chance to work with the group. "I had a demo tape of 18 songs," Jerden recalled, "and I listened to it every night all summer. I picked nine songs from the tape and put them in an order. And then I said to the band, 'Let's do these nine songs. You'll rehearse them in this order, and we'll record them in this order.' And that's what we did."

During the recording sessions, Farrell stated he wanted 50% of the band's publishing royalties for writing the lyrics, plus a quarter of the remaining half for writing music, adding up to 62.5%. Bassist Eric Avery said he and the other members – guitarist Dave Navarro and drummer Stephen Perkins – were stunned by these demands. One day Jerden drove to the studio to find Farrell, Navarro, and Perkins leaving; Farrell told him the band had broken up and there would be no record. Warner Bros. called an emergency meeting to resolve the situation. Farrell received the percentage he sought, and the other members received 12.5% each. Avery said the incident had a profound effect on the band, creating an internal fracture.

Not long after the royalties dispute, Farrell and Avery – who had cofounded the band – had a falling out. This was the result of Avery's newfound sobriety as well as an incident in which Farrell believed Avery had drunkenly tried to pick up his girlfriend. "Unfortunately," Farrell recalled, "the tensions between Eric and I affected the whole family. Some people were asked to take sides, and others just moped about because they didn't know what was going on." Perkins, however, is reported to have got along with Navarro, Avery, and Farrell.

Music
The writing process varied from song to song. "Some came from Eric's bass lines," noted Navarro, "some from guitar, some came from Perry, some came from drum riffs, and some just came from free-form jams. There was really no formula." Avery wrote several songs, including "Mountain Song", "Had a Dad", "Jane Says", and "Summertime Rolls" (the latter two of which he also created the guitar parts for). For his songs, Avery came up with lyrical concepts that Perry Farrell would create lyrics for; for example, "Had a Dad" dealt with Avery discovering he had a different biological father.

"Jane Says" and "Pigs in Zen", which first appeared on the band's self-titled 1987 debut, were rerecorded for Nothing's Shocking. The later version of "Jane Says" features a steel drum while the spoken interlude in "Pigs in Zen" is completely different.

"Mountain Song" – originally released in 1986 on the soundtrack for the film Dudes – was also rerecorded. Musically similar to the original, it is sung in a higher key, to be consistent with the rest of the record. The 1986 original saw a more widespread release when it was included on the band's 1997 outtake/alternate/live and new compilation Kettle Whistle.

Red Hot Chili Peppers bassist Flea played trumpet on "Idiots Rule".

Packaging
Farrell created the cover image, which features a sculpture of nude female conjoined twins on a rocking chair with their heads on fire. He hired Warner Bros. employees to create the sculpture, but – after learning how to create sculptures by watching them closely – fired them and created the artwork himself. "The idea came from a dream I had," he recalled. "There were these two women swinging back and forth. They were joined at the hip and shoulder, and their hair was on fire. I just went from there, and [girlfriend] Casey [Niccoli] assisted me. We had a fellow come and do a plaster body-casting of her, then we made the twins' hair and head gear from pipe cleaners. You'll notice the chair rocks from side to side, as opposed to back and forth, so we had to have that made specially. We also went shopping for fake eyeballs."

Owing to the cover, nine of the eleven leading record store chains refused to carry Nothing's Shocking. It was issued covered with brown paper.

Release
"Mountain Song" was released as a single; however, MTV refused to air the song's music video owing to a scene containing graphic nudity. Farrell decided to release the video commercially, adding twenty minutes of live footage to create the Soul Kiss home video.

Lack of airplay on MTV and modern rock radio meant Nothing's Shocking sold only 200,000 to 250,000 copies in its first year of release. By 1998, it had been certified platinum by the Recording Industry Association of America for shipments of one million copies in the United States.

2012 remaster
A remastered edition of Nothing's Shocking was released on June 19, 2012 on a 24 karat gold disc.

Other than the addition of remastering production credits and a cardboard slipcase over the standard jewel case, the liner notes and artwork are almost identical to the original release. Likewise, the track list remained unchanged. The most notable artwork difference between the original and the remaster is in the color of band name typeface on the cover: the original is rendered in a deep teal color with black outline while the remaster features a light grey type with purple outline.

Produced by Audio Fidelity, the remaster had a limited production run of 5,000 units. Each pressing came individually numbered.

Critical reception

Reviewing Nothing's Shocking for Rolling Stone, Steve Pond praised Jane's Addiction as "the true heir to Led Zeppelin" and called the album "simultaneously forbidding and weighty, delicate and ethereal", while also distinctly more "hardheaded and realistic" in sensibility than Led Zeppelin's music. Los Angeles Times critic Richard Cromelin commented that Jane's Addiction "sounds supremely assured as it alternates its taut, brutal metal alloy with oddly endearing moments of reflection", describing their style as "a bracing throwback to rebellious sources and forces of excess like old Black Sabbath and Alice Cooper". Ken Tucker, writing for The Philadelphia Inquirer, found the album's lyrics incomprehensible in meaning, but viewed them as secondary to the music, which he deemed "first-rate – deceptively slapdash, passionately messy, thoroughly exhilarating." Kerrang!s Phil Wilding hailed Jane's Addiction as "the second coming" and posited that their innovation would be "understood" over time, while Qs Martin Aston wrote that the band manages to recall acts such as Led Zeppelin and Van Halen without resorting to "the plagiarism that plagues the HM/hard rock genre." Jack Barron of NME credited Jane's Addiction for having "breadth" and concluded that they "come from a town ruled by glam where talent is only mascara deep, but this is no five-year-old's IQ on show here."

At the end of 1988, Nothing's Shocking was voted the 34th best album of the year in The Village Voices Pazz & Jop critics' poll. The poll's curator, Robert Christgau, was lukewarm toward the record, summarizing Jane's Addiction as "Alice Cooper revisited" while conceding that "if they stick at it like the pros they'll be, they might land an 'Only Women Bleed.'"

In a retrospective review, AllMusic's Greg Prato called Nothing's Shocking a "now classic" album and "a must-have for lovers of cutting-edge, influential, and timeless hard rock." Steve Hochman, writing in the 2004 edition of The Rolling Stone Album Guide, regarded it as an "often stunning" work whose songs juxtapose "slinky Zeppelin thunder with personal/poetic imagery recalling Lou Reed." "Even with all the baggage of prophecy and influence," wrote Ian Cohen of Pitchfork, "Nothing's Shocking lives as a poignant, almost quixotic work of Hollywood imagination". Pitchfork listed it as one of the 1980s' best albums in 2002, ranking it 90th, and in 2018, ranking it 134th. In 2006, Q named it the 32nd best album of the 1980s. Nothing's Shocking was ranked at number 312 on Rolling Stones 2012 edition of its "500 Greatest Albums of All Time" list.

Track listing

* Does not appear on the vinyl edition of the album.
** Contains a quote from Ted Bundy.

Personnel
Jane's Addiction
 Perry Farrell – vocals, piano
 Dave Navarro – electric and acoustic guitars
 Eric Avery – bass guitar, acoustic guitar
 Stephen Perkins – drums, percussion

Additional musicians
 Angelo Moore – saxophone
 Flea – trumpet
 Christopher Dowd – trombone

Recording personnel
 Dave Jerden – production, mixing, and recording engineer
 Perry Farrell – production, mixing
 Ronnie S. Champagne – recording engineer
 Andy Harper – recording engineer
 Jeff Piergeorge – second recording engineer
 Steve Hall – mastering (original album)
 Kevin Gray – mastering (2012 remastered album)

Additional personnel
 Perry Farrell – album design, sculpture and photography
 Casey Niccoli – art assistant, photography
 Kevin Westenberg – band photography
 Kim Champagne – art hostess
 Paul Fisher – castings
 Roberta Ballard – production coordinator (2012 remastered album)

Charts

Certifications

References

Bibliography

External links

 Nothing's Shocking (Adobe Flash) at Radio3Net (streamed copy where licensed)

1988 debut albums
Jane's Addiction albums
Albums produced by Dave Jerden
Warner Records albums
Obscenity controversies in music